The Yarra Junior Football League is the largest junior Australian rules football league in Australia. The league has a total of 32 clubs, who are based around northern, eastern and north-eastern Melbourne. There is a total of 66 divisions throughout the league.

History
The Yarra Junior Football League was first formed through the merging of the old Doncaster & Districts and the Hawthorn Districts Junior Football Leagues in 1997. The league began with a total of 4628 registered players. They were spread out between 180 teams and 25 foundation clubs. Since then, the number of players is over double the original number, with 10,614 players participating in 2019. It has also grown to 508 teams between 32 clubs, as per data gathered in 2019.

In 2000, the Heidelberg Tigers moved into the YJFL after a major club reform. Over the next ten years, 5 teams joined the league, those teams being the Preston Bullants in 2001, the North Brunswick Giants in 2005 (at that time known as the 'Bulls'), the Parkside Devils and certain divisions from the Ashburton Redbacks in 2006, the Boroondara Hawks and the rest of the divisions from the Ashburton Redbacks in 2008, and the Brunswick Dragons in 2010.

In 2011, the first Youth Girls divisions were launched, with some teams given the support of the AFL.

In 2015 and 2016, the league witnessed spikes in growth after they introduced an Under 8s competition and the new South Yarra Junior Football Club.

In January 2020, the presidents from the former Greythorn Falcons and Balwyn Tigers decided to merge their clubs into the Balwyn Greythorn Jets Junior Football Club, to create a more powerful club, as they were already located very close together.

Clubs

Current

Former

Girls Football

Beginnings
The first girls division was introduced in the 2011 season as a 'Youth Girls' (under 18) division, which had a total of 10 teams participating. This division also included teams from other leagues that did not have any girls-only divisions.

In 2012 a girls under 12 division was formed, with 5 clubs fielding teams in the division. The 'Youth Girls' division grew to a total of 12 teams, up two from the year before. One year later, an under 14 girls division was formed to help bridge the gap between the Youth Girls and under 12 girls divisions. It had a total of 4 teams participating in its first year. The number of teams in these divisions nearly doubled in 2014, rising from 17 to 31.

Present
After only 10 teams in the first year of female-only teams in the Yarra Junior Football League, the total spiked to 122 female-only teams in 2019. There were 2810 female players in the league in 2019, which meant that female-players made up just over a quarter of all players in the league. There are now eight female divisions: Under 10 Girls, Under 11 Girls, Under 12 Girls, Under 13 Girls, Under 14 Girls, Under 15 Girls, Under 16 Girls and the Youth Girls.

Community

North East Link Controversy
The Yarra Junior Football League community rallied against the controversial North East Link project, due to the removal of their headquarters, which was in the path of the proposed road. The North East Link Authority proposed a new headquarters location at Ford Park, Ivanhoe, but met resistance from the league due to worries that Ford Park is too far away for many teams in the league.

Partnership with Collingwood
In early July 2020, it was announced that the Collingwood Football Club would enter a 'Major Community Partnership' with the Yarra Junior Football League. This partnership was formed as a part of an initiative to support grassroots football. Six main projects were announced as part of the partnership, including junior development programs to encourage participation in junior football, sport medical programs and research, fundraising events to raise money, support for talent pathways for junior players through to the elite levels, female football development programs and the development of projects to expand community facilities.

AFL Talent
The Yarra Junior Football League has been home to many players who went on to play in the AFL. Players who played in the Yarra Junior Football League who made it to the AFL are listed by club below:

Adelaide Football Club
Jake Kelly
David Mackay
Ayce Taylor
Ben Crocker
Brisbane Lions Football Club
Toby Wooller
Carlton Football Club
Marc Murphy
Matthew Kreuzer
Jack Silvagni
Sam Philp
Ben Silvagni
Marc Pittonet
Jack Newnes
Dylan Buckley
Collingwood Football Club
Tom Langdon
Jordan De Goey
Darcy Moore
Tom Phillips
Brayden Sier
Rupert Wills
Callum Brown
Josh Daicos
Tyler Brown
Isaac Quaynor
Finlay Macrae
Trent Bianco
Atu Bosenavulagi
Essendon Football Club
Michael Hurley
Patrick Ambrose
Kyle Langford
James Stewart
Tom Cutler
Gold Coast Football Club
Matthew Rowell
Noah Anderson
Greater Western Sydney Football Club
Toby Greene
Aidan Corr
Hawthorn Football Club
Blake Hardwick
Tom Mitchell
Melbourne Football Club
Adam Tomlinson
Jack Viney
Christian Petracca
Ed Langdon
North Melbourne Football Club
Jamie MacMillan
Luke McDonald
Ed Vickers-Willis
Nick Larkey
Dom Tyson
Port Adelaide Football Club
Darcy Byrne-Jones
Dan Houston
Richmond Football Club
Jason Castagna
Kane Lambert
Patrick Naish
St Kilda Football Club
Jack Billings
Jack Sinclair
Dan Hannebery
Nick Coffield
Sydney Swans Football Club
Josh Kennedy
James Rowbottom
Justin McInerney
West Coast Football Club
Luke Shuey
Andrew Gaff
Western Bulldogs Football Club
Jack Macrae
Billy Gowers
Ed Richards

References

Australian rules football clubs established in 1997
Australian rules football competitions in Victoria (Australia)